Hale Isaac Appleman (born January 17, 1986) is an American actor. He is known for playing Tobey Cobb in the 2007 film Teeth and Eliot in the television fantasy series The Magicians.

Early life
Appleman was raised in Manhattan, New York. He spent four summers at the performing arts summer camp French Woods and attended the Fiorello H. LaGuardia High School. After attending Carnegie Mellon for "a year and a month or two", he dropped out to film a role in a movie.

Career
Appleman's credits on stage include the revival of  Streamers at the Roundabout Theater Company, Clifford Odets' Paradise Lost at the American Repertory Theater, and the New York premiere of Sarah Ruhl's Passion Play as Jesus. In 2011, he played Bob in  Moonchildren at the Berkshire Theatre Festival, and can be heard on the L.A. Theatre Works recording of Sam Shepard's  Buried Child. Appleman was seen at The Old Globe Theater as Mercutio in The Last Goodbye.

Appleman played Zach on the NBC musical drama series Smash. He made his film debut in Beautiful Ohio and portrayed cartoonist Judd Winick in Pedro. His other credits include Mercutio in Private Romeo, the short film Oysters Rockefeller, and The Magicians, a TV series based on the novel of the same name by Lev Grossman, in which he played the magician Eliot from 2015 to 2020.

Personal life
Appleman has said that he is "definitely not straight" and described himself as queer.

Filmography

Film

Television

References

External links
 

Living people
American male film actors
1986 births
LGBT male actors
American LGBT actors
Queer actors
Queer men